Jørun Adeleid Drevland (born 15 March 1944) is a Norwegian politician for the Socialist Left Party.

She served as a deputy representative to the Parliament of Norway from Nordland during the term 1993–1997. She met during 7 days of parliamentary session.

She hails from Sortland, and in 2012 she worked with artist Bjørn Elvenes on an initiative to paint the town blue as an art project. She is the mother of musician Sivert Høyem.

References

1944 births
Living people
People from Sortland
Socialist Left Party (Norway) politicians
Deputy members of the Storting
Nordland politicians